A referendum on the islands' status was held in the Northern Mariana Islands  on 5 February 1961. Although 65% of voters supported integration with Guam, the United States did not integrate the islands.

Background
Saipan had been administratively separated from Guam since 1898, when the latter had come under American control. Saipan also came under American control in 1947. In 1957, the Popular Party had victories in Guam and Northern Marianas. In 1958, an unofficial poll in Saipan had been in favor of integration and the Guam Legislature had asked the US Congress to integrate the Northern Marianas's government into Guam's.

The 1961 referendum was organized by the local Parliament, as members wished to integrate with Guam. It was held prior to a March visit by a United Nations commission checking on the conditions of the UN trust territories. Rota was in a different district at the time, and could not vote.

Results
Voters were given four options:
[A] Do you desire to become United States citizens within the political framework of Guam?
[B] Do you desire to become United States citizens by becoming a separate territory of the United States?
[C] Do you desire to remain in the same status?
[D] Other Wishes?

Aftermath
The Carolinian community held a poll opposed to integration. Both results were given to the UN mission upon its arrival, but neither affected the mission's stance that the area needed greater self-reliance. Later referendums were held in 1963 and 1969.

References

1961 referendums
1961 in the Northern Mariana Islands
Constitutional referendums in the Northern Mariana Islands
Administrative division referendums
Sovereignty referendums
Autonomy referendums
Border polls